Over a thousand indigenous languages are spoken by the Indigenous peoples of the Americas. These languages cannot all be demonstrated to be related to each other and are classified into a hundred or so language families (including a large number of language isolates), as well as a number of extinct languages that are unclassified because of a lack of data.

Many proposals have been made to relate some or all of these languages to each other, with varying degrees of success. The best known is Joseph Greenberg's Amerind hypothesis, which however nearly all specialists reject because of severe methodological flaws; spurious data; and a failure to distinguish cognation, contact, and coincidence. Nonetheless, there are indications that some of the recognized families are related to each other, such as widespread similarities in pronouns (e.g., n/m is a common pattern for 'I'/'you' across western North America, and ch/k/t for 'I'/'you'/'we' is similarly found in a more limited region of South America).

According to UNESCO, most of the Indigenous languages of the Americas are critically endangered, and many are dormant (without native speakers but with a community of heritage-language users) or entirely extinct. The most widely spoken Indigenous languages are Southern Quechua (spoken primarily in southern Peru and Bolivia) and Guarani (centered in Paraguay, where it shares national language status with Spanish), with perhaps six or seven million speakers apiece (including many of European descent in the case of Guarani). Only half a dozen others have more than a million speakers; these are Aymara of Bolivia and Nahuatl of Mexico, with almost two million each; the Mayan languages Kekchi, Quiché, and Yucatec of Guatemala and Mexico, with about 1 million apiece; and perhaps one or two additional Quechuan languages in Peru and Ecuador. In the United States, 372,000 people reported speaking an Indigenous language at home in the 2010 census,
and similarly in Canada, 133,000 people reported speaking an Indigenous language at home in the 2011 census. In Greenland, about 90% of the population speaks Greenlandic, the most widely spoken Eskimo–Aleut language.

Background

Over a thousand known languages were spoken by various peoples in North and South America prior to their first contact with Europeans. These encounters occurred between the beginning of the 11th century (with the Nordic settlement of Greenland and failed efforts in Newfoundland and Labrador) and the end of the 15th century (the voyages of Christopher Columbus). Several Indigenous cultures of the Americas had also developed their own writing systems, the best known being the Maya script.  The Indigenous languages of the Americas had widely varying demographics, from the Quechuan languages, Aymara, Guarani, and Nahuatl, which had millions of active speakers, to many languages with only several hundred speakers. After pre-Columbian times, several Indigenous creole languages developed in the Americas, based on European, Indigenous and African languages.

The European colonizers and their successor states had widely varying attitudes towards Native American languages. In Brazil, friars learned and promoted the Tupi language. In many Spanish colonies, Spanish missionaries often learned local languages and culture in order to preach to the natives in their own tongue and relate the Christian message to their Indigenous religions. In the British American colonies, John Eliot of the Massachusetts Bay Colony translated the Bible into the Massachusett language, also called Wampanoag, or Natick (1661–1663); he published the first Bible printed in North America, the Eliot Indian Bible.

The Europeans also suppressed use of Indigenous languages, establishing their own languages for official communications, destroying texts in other languages, and insisting that Indigenous people learn European languages in schools. As a result, Indigenous languages suffered from cultural suppression and loss of speakers. By the 18th and 19th centuries, Spanish, English, Portuguese, French, and Dutch, brought to the Americas by European settlers and administrators, had become the official or national languages of modern nation-states of the Americas.

Many Indigenous languages have become critically endangered, but others are vigorous and part of daily life for millions of people. Several Indigenous languages have been given official status in the countries where they occur, such as Guaraní in Paraguay. In other cases official status is limited to certain regions where the languages are most spoken. Although sometimes enshrined in constitutions as official, the languages may be used infrequently in de facto official use. Examples are Quechua in Peru and Aymara in Bolivia, where in practice, Spanish is dominant in all formal contexts.

In the North American Arctic region, Greenland in 2009 adopted Kalaallisut as its sole official language. In the United States, the Navajo language is the most spoken Native American language, with more than 200,000 speakers in the Southwestern United States. The US Marine Corps recruited Navajo men, who were established as code talkers during World War II.

Origins

In American Indian Languages: The Historical Linguistics of Native America (1997), Lyle Campbell lists several hypotheses for the historical origins of Amerindian languages.

 A single, one-language migration (not widely accepted)
 A few linguistically distinct migrations (favored by Edward Sapir)
 Multiple migrations
 Multilingual migrations (single migration with multiple languages)
 The influx of already diversified but related languages from the Old World
 Extinction of Old World linguistic relatives (while the New World ones survived)
 Migration along the Pacific coast instead of by the Bering Strait

Roger Blench (2008) has advocated the theory of multiple migrations along the Pacific coast of peoples from northeastern Asia, who already spoke diverse languages. These proliferated in the New World.

Numbers of speakers and political recognition
Countries like Mexico, Bolivia, Venezuela, Guatemala, and Guyana recognize all or most Indigenous languages native to their respective countries, with Bolivia and Venezuela elevating all Indigenous languages to official language status according to their constitutions. Colombia delegates local Indigenous language recognition to the department level according to the Colombian Constitution of 1991. Countries like Canada, Argentina, and the United States allow their respective provinces and states to determine their own language recognition policies. Indigenous language recognition in Brazil is limited to their localities.

 Bullet points represent minority language status. Political entities with official language status are highlighted in bold.

Language families and unclassified languages

Notes:
 Extinct languages or families are indicated by:  †.
 The number of family members is indicated in parentheses (for example, Arauan (9) means the Arauan family consists of nine languages).
 For convenience, the following list of language families is divided into three sections based on political boundaries of countries. These sections correspond roughly with the geographic regions (North, Central, and South America) but are not equivalent. This division cannot fully delineate Indigenous culture areas.

Northern America

There are approximately 296 spoken (or formerly spoken) Indigenous languages north of Mexico, 269 of which are grouped into 29 families (the remaining 27 languages are either isolates or unclassified). The Na-Dené, Algic, and Uto-Aztecan families are the largest in terms of number of languages. Uto-Aztecan has the most speakers (1.95 million) if the languages in Mexico are considered (mostly due to 1.5 million speakers of Nahuatl); Na-Dené comes in second with approximately 200,000 speakers (nearly 180,000 of these are speakers of Navajo), and Algic in third with about 180,000 speakers (mainly Cree and Ojibwe). Na-Dené and Algic have the widest geographic distributions: Algic currently spans from northeastern Canada across much of the continent down to northeastern Mexico (due to later migrations of the Kickapoo) with two outliers in California (Yurok and Wiyot); Na-Dené spans from Alaska and western Canada through Washington, Oregon, and California to the U.S. Southwest and northern Mexico (with one outlier in the Plains). Several families consist of only 2 or 3 languages. Demonstrating genetic relationships has proved difficult due to the great linguistic diversity present in North America. Two large (super-) family proposals, Penutian and Hokan, look particularly promising. However, even after decades of research, a large number of families remain.

North America is notable for its linguistic diversity, especially in California. This area has 18 language families comprising 74 languages (compared to four families in Europe: Indo-European, Uralic, Turkic, and Afroasiatic and one isolate, Basque).

Another area of considerable diversity appears to have been the Southeastern Woodlands; however, many of these languages became extinct from European contact and as a result they are, for the most part, absent from the historical record. This diversity has influenced the development of linguistic theories and practice in the US.

Due to the diversity of languages in North America, it is difficult to make generalizations for the region. Most North American languages have a relatively small number of vowels (i.e. three to five vowels). Languages of the western half of North America often have relatively large consonant inventories. The languages of the Pacific Northwest are notable for their complex phonotactics (for example, some languages have words that lack vowels entirely). The languages of the Plateau area have relatively rare pharyngeals and epiglottals (they are otherwise restricted to Afroasiatic languages and the languages of the Caucasus). Ejective consonants are also common in western North America, although they are rare elsewhere (except, again, for the Caucasus region, parts of Africa, and the Mayan family).

Head-marking is found in many languages of North America (as well as in Central and South America), but outside of the Americas it is rare. Many languages throughout North America are polysynthetic (Eskimo–Aleut languages are extreme examples), although this is not characteristic of all North American languages (contrary to what was believed by 19th-century linguists). Several families have unique traits, such as the inverse number marking of the Tanoan languages, the lexical affixes of the Wakashan, Salishan and Chimakuan languages, and the unusual verb structure of Na-Dené.

The classification below is a composite of Goddard (1996), Campbell (1997), and Mithun (1999).

 Adai †
 Algic (30)
 Alsea (2) †
 Atakapa †
 Beothuk †
 Caddoan (5)
 Cayuse †
 Chimakuan (2) †
 Chimariko †
 Chinookan (3) †
 Chitimacha †
 Chumashan (6) †
 Coahuilteco †
 Comecrudan (United States & Mexico) (3) †
 Coosan (2) †
 Cotoname †
 Eskimo–Aleut (7)
 Esselen †
 Haida
 Iroquoian (11)
 Kalapuyan (3) †
 Karankawa †
 Karuk
 Keresan (2)
 Kutenai
 Maiduan (4)
 Muskogean (9)
 Na-Dené (United States, Canada & Mexico) (39)
 Natchez †
 Palaihnihan (2) †
 Plateau Penutian  (4) 
 Pomoan (7)
 Salinan †
 Salishan (23)
 Shastan (4) †
 Siouan (19)
 Siuslaw †
 Solano †
 Takelma †
 Tanoan (7)
 Timucua †
 Tonkawa †
 Tsimshianic (2)
 Tunica †
 Utian (15) 
 Uto-Aztecan (33)
 Wakashan (7)
 Wappo †
 Washo
 Wintuan (4)
 Yana †
 Yokutsan (3)
 Yuchi
 Yuki †
 Yuman–Cochimí (11)
 Zuni

Central America and Mexico

In Central America the Mayan languages are among those used today. Mayan languages are spoken by at least 6 million Indigenous Maya, primarily in Guatemala, Mexico, Belize and Honduras. In 1996, Guatemala formally recognized 21 Mayan languages by name, and Mexico recognizes eight more. The Mayan language family is one of the best documented and most studied in the Americas. Modern Mayan languages descend from Proto-Mayan, a language thought to have been spoken at least 4,000 years ago; it has been partially reconstructed using the comparative method. 

 Alagüilac (Guatemala) †
 Chibchan (Central America & South America) (22)
 Coahuilteco †
 Comecrudan (Texas & Mexico) (3) †
 Cotoname †
 Cuitlatec (Mexico: Guerrero) †
 Epi-Olmec (Mexico: language of undeciphered inscriptions) †
 Guaicurian  (8) †
 Huave
 Jicaquean (2)
 Lencan (2) †
 Maratino (northeastern Mexico) †
 Mayan (31)
 Misumalpan (5)
 Mixe–Zoquean (19)
 Naolan (Mexico: Tamaulipas) †
 Oto-Manguean (27)
 Pericú †
 Purépecha
 Quinigua (northeast Mexico) †
 Seri
 Solano †
 Tequistlatecan (3)
 Totonacan (2)
 Uto-Aztecan (United States & Mexico) (33)
 Xincan (5) †
 Yuman (United States & Mexico) (11)

South America and the Caribbean

Although both North and Central America are very diverse areas, South America has a linguistic diversity rivalled by only a few other places in the world with approximately 350 languages still spoken and several hundred more spoken at first contact but now extinct. The situation of language documentation and classification into genetic families is not as advanced as in North America (which is relatively well studied in many areas). Kaufman (1994: 46) gives the following appraisal:

Since the mid 1950s, the amount of published material on SA [South America] has been gradually growing, but even so, the number of researchers is far smaller than the growing number of linguistic communities whose speech should be documented. Given the current employment opportunities, it is not likely that the number of specialists in SA Indian languages will increase fast enough to document most of the surviving SA languages before they go out of use, as most of them unavoidably will. More work languishes in personal files than is published, but this is a standard problem.

It is fair to say that SA and New Guinea are linguistically the poorest documented parts of the world. However, in the early 1960s fairly systematic efforts were launched in Papua New Guinea, and that areamuch smaller than SA, to be sureis in general much better documented than any part of Indigenous SA of comparable size.

As a result, many relationships between languages and language families have not been determined and some of those relationships that have been proposed are on somewhat shaky ground.

The list of language families, isolates, and unclassified languages below is a rather conservative one based on Campbell (1997). Many of the proposed (and often speculative) groupings of families can be seen in Campbell (1997), Gordon (2005), Kaufman (1990, 1994), Key (1979), Loukotka (1968), and in the Language stock proposals section below.

 Aguano †
 Aikaná (Brazil: Rondônia) 
 Andaquí  †
 Andoque (Colombia, Peru) 
 Andoquero †
 Arauan  (9)
 Arawakan (South America & Caribbean) (64) 
 Arutani
 Aymaran  (3)
 Baenan (Brazil: Bahia)  †
 Barbacoan (8)
 Betoi (Colombia)  †
 Bororoan
 Botocudoan  (3) 
 Cahuapanan  (2) 
 Camsá (Colombia) 
 Candoshi 
 Canichana (Bolivia) 
 Carabayo
 Cariban  (29) 
 Catacaoan  †
 Cayubaba (Bolivia)
 Chapacuran  (9) 
 Charruan  †
 Chibchan (Central America & South America) (22)
 Chimuan (3) †
 Chipaya–Uru 
 Chiquitano
 Choco  (10) 
 Chon  (2) 
 Chono †
 Coeruna (Brazil) †
 Cofán (Colombia, Ecuador)
 Cueva †
 Culle (Peru)  †
 Cunza (Chile, Bolivia, Argentina)  †
 Esmeraldeño  †
 Fulnió
 Gamela (Brazil: Maranhão) †
 Gorgotoqui (Bolivia) †
 Guaicuruan (7) 
 Guajiboan (4) 
 Guamo (Venezuela)  †
 Guató
 Harakmbut  (2) 
 Hibito–Cholon †
 Himarimã
 Hodï (Venezuela) 
 Huamoé (Brazil: Pernambuco) †
 Huaorani (Ecuador, Peru) 
 Huarpe  †
 Irantxe (Brazil: Mato Grosso)
 Itonama (Bolivia) 
 Jabutian
 Je (13) 
 Jeikó †
 Jirajaran (3)  †
 Jivaroan  (2) 
 Kaimbe
 Kaliana 
 Kamakanan †
 Kapixaná (Brazil: Rondônia) 
 Karajá
 Karirí (Brazil: Paraíba, Pernambuco, Ceará) † Katembrí † Katukinan  (3) 
 Kawésqar (Chile) 
 Kwaza (Koayá) (Brazil: Rondônia)
 Leco 
 Lule (Argentina) 
 Máku 
 Malibú 
 Mapudungun (Chile, Argentina) 
 Mascoyan  (5) 
 Matacoan  (4) 
 Matanawí †
 Maxakalían (3) 
 Mocana (Colombia: Tubará) †
 Mosetenan 
 Movima (Bolivia)
 Munichi (Peru) 
 Muran  (4)
 Mutú 
 Nadahup (5)
 Nambiquaran  (5)
 Natú (Brazil: Pernambuco) †
 Nonuya (Peru, Colombia)
 Ofayé
 Old Catío–Nutabe (Colombia) †
 Omurano (Peru)  †
 Otí (Brazil: São Paulo) †
 Otomakoan (2) †
 Paez (also known as Nasa Yuwe)
 Palta †
 Pankararú (Brazil: Pernambuco) †
 Pano–Tacanan  (33)
 Panzaleo (Ecuador)  †
 Patagon † (Peru)
 Peba–Yaguan  (2)  
 Pijao†
 Pre-Arawakan languages of the Greater Antilles (Guanahatabey, Macorix, Ciguayo)  † (Cuba, Hispaniola) 
 Puelche (Chile)  †
 Puinave 
 Puquina (Bolivia) †
 Purian (2) †
 Quechuan  (46)
 Rikbaktsá
 Saliban  (2) 
 Sechura  †
 Tabancale † (Peru)
 Tairona (Colombia) †
 Tarairiú (Brazil: Rio Grande do Norte) †
 Taruma †
 Taushiro (Peru) 
 Tequiraca (Peru)  †
 Teushen † (Patagonia, Argentina)
 Ticuna (Colombia, Peru, Brazil) 
 Timotean (2) †
 Tiniguan (2)  †
 Trumai (Brazil: Xingu, Mato Grosso)
 Tucanoan  (15)
 Tupian  (70, including Guaraní)
 Tuxá (Brazil: Bahia, Pernambuco) †
 Urarina 
 Vilela
 Wakona †
 Warao (Guyana, Surinam, Venezuela) 
 Witotoan  (6) 
 Xokó (Brazil: Alagoas, Pernambuco)  †
 Xukurú (Brazil: Pernambuco, Paraíba) †
 Yaghan (Chile) 
 Yanomaman  (4)
 Yaruro 
 Yuracare (Bolivia)
 Yuri (Colombia, Brazil)  †
 Yurumanguí (Colombia)  †
 Zamucoan  (2)
 Zaparoan  (5)

Language stock proposals

Hypothetical language-family proposals of American languages are often cited as uncontroversial in popular writing. However, many of these proposals have not been fully demonstrated, or even demonstrated at all. Some proposals are viewed by specialists in a favorable light, believing that genetic relationships are very likely to be established in the future (for example, the Penutian stock). Other proposals are more controversial with many linguists believing that some genetic relationships of a proposal may be demonstrated but much of it undemonstrated (for example, Hokan–Siouan, which, incidentally, Edward Sapir called his "wastepaper basket stock"). Still other proposals are almost unanimously rejected by specialists (for example, Amerind). Below is a (partial) list of some such proposals:

 Algonquian–Wakashan   
 Almosan–Keresiouan   
 Amerind   
 Algonkian–Gulf   
 (macro-)Arawakan
 Arutani–Sape 
 Aztec–Tanoan   
 Chibchan–Paezan
 Chikitano–Boróroan
 Chimu–Chipaya
 Coahuiltecan   
 Cunza–Kapixanan
 Dené–Caucasian
 Dené–Yeniseian
 Esmerelda–Yaruroan
 Ge–Pano–Carib
 Guamo–Chapacuran
 Gulf   
 Macro-Kulyi–Cholónan
 Hokan   
 Hokan–Siouan   
 Je–Tupi–Carib
 Jivaroan–Cahuapanan
 Kalianan
 Kandoshi–Omurano–Taushiro
 (Macro-)Katembri–Taruma
 Kaweskar language area
 Keresiouan   
 Lule–Vilelan
 Macro-Andean
 Macro-Carib
 Macro-Chibchan
 Macro-Gê   
 Macro-Jibaro
 Macro-Lekoan
 Macro-Mayan
 Macro-Otomákoan
 Macro-Paesan
 Macro-Panoan
 Macro-Puinavean
 Macro-Siouan   
 Macro-Tucanoan
 Macro-Tupí–Karibe
 Macro-Waikurúan
 Macro-Warpean   
 Mataco–Guaicuru
 Mosan   
 Mosetén–Chonan
 Mura–Matanawian
 Sapir's Na-Dené including Haida   
 Nostratic–Amerind
 Paezan 
 Paezan–Barbacoan
 Penutian   
California Penutian   
Oregon Penutian   
Mexican Penutian   
 Puinave–Maku
 Quechumaran
 Saparo–Yawan   
 Sechura–Catacao 
 Takelman   
 Tequiraca–Canichana
 Ticuna–Yuri (Yuri–Ticunan)
 Totozoque   
 Tunican   
 Yok–Utian
 Yuki–Wappo

Good discussions of past proposals can be found in Campbell (1997) and Campbell & Mithun (1979).

Amerindian linguist Lyle Campbell also assigned different percentage values of probability and confidence for various proposals of macro-families and language relationships, depending on his views of the proposals' strengths. For example, the Germanic language family would receive probability and confidence percentage values of +100% and 100%, respectively. However, if Turkish and Quechua were compared, the probability value might be −95%, while the confidence value might be 95%. 0% probability or confidence would mean complete uncertainty.

Pronouns 

It has long been observed that a remarkable number of Native American languages have a pronominal pattern with first-person singular forms in n and second-person singular forms in m. (Compare first-person singular m and second-person singular t across much of northern Eurasia, as in English me and thee, Spanish me and te, and Hungarian -m and -d.) This pattern was first noted by Alfredo Trombetti in 1905. It caused Sapir to suggest that ultimately all Native American languages would turn out to be related. In a personal letter to A. L. Kroeber he wrote (Sapir 1918):

The supposed "n/m – I/you" pattern has attracted attention even from those linguists who are normally critical of such long-distance proposals. Johanna Nichols investigated the distribution of the languages that have an n/m pattern and found that they are mostly confined to the western coast of the Americas, and that similarly they exist in East Asia and northern New Guinea. She suggested that they had spread through diffusion. This notion was rejected by Lyle Campbell, who argued that the frequency of the n/m pattern was not statistically elevated in either area compared to the rest of the world. Campbell also showed that several of the languages that have the contrast today did not have it historically and stated that the pattern was largely consistent with chance resemblance, especially when taking into consideration the statistic prevalence of nasal consonants in all the pronominal systems of the world. Zamponi found that Nichols's findings were distorted by her small sample size, and that some n–m languages were recent developments (though also that some languages had lost an ancestral n–m pattern), but he did find a statistical excess of the n–m pattern in western North America only. Looking at families rather than individual languages, he found a rate of 30% of families/protolanguages in North America, all on the western flank, compared to 5% in South America and 7% of non-American languages – though the percentage in North America, and especially the even higher number in the Pacific Northwest, drops considerably if Hokan and Penutian, or parts of them, are accepted as language families. If all the proposed Penutian and Hokan languages in the table below are related, then the frequency drops to 9% of North American families, statistically indistinguishable from the world average.

Below is a list of families with both 1sg n and 2sg m, though in some cases the evidence for one of the forms is weak.

Other scattered families may have one or the other but not both. 

Besides Proto-Eskaleut and Proto-Na–Dene, the families in North America with neither 1sg n or 2sg m are Atakapan, Chitimacha, Cuitlatec, Haida, Kutenai, Proto-Caddoan, Proto-Chimakuan, Proto-Comecrudan, Proto-Iroquoian, Proto-Muskogean, Proto-Siouan-Catawba, Tonkawa, Waikuri, Yana, Yuchi, Zuni. 

There are also a number of neighboring families in South America that have a tʃ–k pattern (the Duho proposal, plus possibly Arutani–Sape), or an i–a pattern (the Macro-Jê proposal, including Fulnio and Chiquitano, plus Matacoan, Zamucoan and Payaguá).

Linguistic areas

Unattested languages
Several languages are only known by mention in historical documents or from only a few names or words. It cannot be determined that these languages actually existed or that the few recorded words are actually of known or unknown languages. Some may simply be from a historian's errors. Others are of known people with no linguistic record (sometimes due to lost records). A short list is below.

 Ais
 Akokisa
 Aranama
 Ausaima
 Avoyel
 Bayagoula
 Bidai
 Cacán (Diaguita–Calchaquí)
 Calusa - Mayaimi - Tequesta
 Cusabo
 Eyeish
 Grigra
 Guale
 Houma
 Koroa
 Mayaca (possibly related to Ais)
 Mobila
 Okelousa
 Opelousa
 Pascagoula
 Pensacola - Chatot (Muscogean languages, possibly related to Choctaw)
 Pijao language
 Pisabo (possibly the same language as Matsés)
 Quinipissa
 Taensa
 Tiou
 Yamacraw
 Yamasee
 Yazoo

Loukotka (1968) reports the names of hundreds of South American languages which do not have any linguistic documentation.

Pidgins and mixed languages
Various miscellaneous languages such as pidgins, mixed languages, trade languages, and sign languages are given below in alphabetical order.

 American Indian Pidgin English
 Algonquian-Basque pidgin 
 Broken Oghibbeway 
 Broken Slavey
 Bungee 
 Callahuaya 
 Carib Pidgin 
 Carib Pidgin–Arawak Mixed Language
 Catalangu
 Chinook Jargon
 Delaware Jargon 
 Eskimo Trade Jargon 
 Greenlandic Pidgin (West Greenlandic Pidgin)
 Guajiro-Spanish
 Güegüence-Nicarao
 Haida Jargon
 Inuktitut-English Pidgin (Quebec)
 Jargonized Powhatan
 Keresan Sign Language
 Labrador Eskimo Pidgin 
 Lingua Franca Apalachee
 Lingua Franca Creek
 Lingua Geral Amazônica 
 Lingua Geral do Sul 
 Loucheux Jargon 
 Media Lengua
 Mednyj Aleut 
 Michif 
 Mobilian Jargon 
 Montagnais Pidgin Basque 
 Nootka Jargon 
 Ocaneechi 
 Pidgin Massachusett
 Plains Indian Sign Language

Writing systems 
While most Indigenous languages have adopted the Latin script as the written form of their languages, a few languages have their own unique writing systems after encountering the Latin script (often through missionaries) that are still in use. All pre-Columbian Indigenous writing systems are no longer used.

See also

 Amerind languages
 Archive of the Indigenous Languages of Latin America
 Classification of indigenous peoples of the Americas
 Classification of indigenous languages of the Americas
 Haplogroup Q-M242 (Y-DNA)
 Indigenous peoples of the Americas
 Language families and languages
 Languages of Peru
 List of endangered languages in Canada
 List of endangered languages in Mexico
 List of endangered languages in the United States
 List of endangered languages with mobile apps
 List of indigenous languages of South America
 List of indigenous languages in Argentina
 Mesoamerican languages
 Native American Languages Act of 1990

Notes

Bibliography

 Bright, William. (1984). The classification of North American and Meso-American Indian languages. In W. Bright (Ed.), American Indian linguistics and literature (pp. 3–29). Berlin: Mouton de Gruyter.
 Bright, William (Ed.). (1984). American Indian linguistics and literature. Berlin: Mouton de Gruyter. .
 Brinton, Daniel G. (1891). The American race. New York: D. C. Hodges.
 Campbell, Lyle. (1997). American Indian languages: The historical linguistics of Native America. New York: Oxford University Press. .
 Campbell, Lyle; & Mithun, Marianne (Eds.). (1979). The languages of native America: Historical and comparative assessment. Austin: University of Texas Press.

North America

 Boas, Franz. (1911). Handbook of American Indian languages (Vol. 1). Bureau of American Ethnology, Bulletin 40. Washington: Government Print Office (Smithsonian Institution, Bureau of American Ethnology). (on archive.org)
 Boas, Franz. (1922). Handbook of American Indian languages (Vol. 2). Bureau of American Ethnology, Bulletin 40. Washington: Government Print Office (Smithsonian Institution, Bureau of American Ethnology). (on archive.org)
 Boas, Franz. (1929). Classification of American Indian languages. Language, 5, 1–7.
 Boas, Franz. (1933). Handbook of American Indian languages (Vol. 3). Native American legal materials collection, title 1227. Glückstadt: J.J. Augustin. (on archive.org)
 Bright, William. (1973). North American Indian language contact. In T. A. Sebeok (Ed.), Linguistics in North America (part 1, pp. 713–726).  Current trends in linguistics (Vol. 10). The Hauge: Mouton.
 Goddard, Ives (Ed.). (1996). Languages. Handbook of North American Indians (W. C. Sturtevant, General Ed.) (Vol. 17). Washington, D. C.: Smithsonian Institution. .
 Goddard, Ives. (1999). Native languages and language families of North America (rev. and enlarged ed. with additions and corrections). [Map]. Lincoln, Nebraska: University of Nebraska Press (Smithsonian Institution). (Updated version of the map in Goddard 1996). .
 Goddard, Ives. (2005). The indigenous languages of the southeast. Anthropological Linguistics, 47 (1), 1–60.
 Mithun, Marianne. (1990). Studies of North American Indian Languages. Annual Review of Anthropology, 19(1): 309–330.
 Mithun, Marianne. (1999). The languages of Native North America. Cambridge: Cambridge University Press.  (hbk); .
 Nater, Hank F. (1984). The Bella Coola Language. Mercury Series; Canadian Ethnology Service (No. 92). Ottawa: National Museums of Canada.
 Powell, John W. (1891). Indian linguistic families of America north of Mexico. Seventh annual report, Bureau of American Ethnology (pp. 1–142). Washington, D.C.: Government Printing Office. (Reprinted in P. Holder (Ed.), 1966, Introduction to Handbook of American Indian languages by Franz Boas and Indian linguistic families of America, north of Mexico, by J. W. Powell, Lincoln: University of Nebraska).
 Powell, John W. (1915). Linguistic families of American Indians north of Mexico by J. W. Powell, revised by members of the staff of the Bureau of American Ethnology. (Map). Bureau of American Ethnology miscellaneous publication (No. 11). Baltimore: Hoen.
 Sebeok, Thomas A. (Ed.). (1973). Linguistics in North America (parts 1 & 2).  Current trends in linguistics (Vol. 10). The Hauge: Mouton. (Reprinted as Sebeok 1976).
 Sebeok, Thomas A. (Ed.). (1976). Native languages of the Americas. New York: Plenum.
 Sherzer, Joel.  (1973).  Areal linguistics in North America.  In T. A. Sebeok (Ed.), Linguistics in North America (part 2, pp. 749–795).  Current trends in linguistics (Vol. 10). The Hauge: Mouton. (Reprinted in Sebeok 1976).
 Sherzer, Joel. (1976). An areal-typological study of American Indian languages north of Mexico. Amsterdam: North-Holland.
 Sletcher, Michael, 'North American Indians', in Will Kaufman and Heidi Macpherson, eds., Britain and the Americas: Culture, Politics, and History, (2 vols., Oxford, 2005).
 Sturtevant, William C. (Ed.). (1978–present). Handbook of North American Indians (Vol. 1–20). Washington, D. C.: Smithsonian Institution. (Vols. 1–3, 16, 18–20 not yet published).
 Vaas, Rüdiger: 'Die Sprachen der Ureinwohner'. In: Stoll, Günter, Vaas, Rüdiger: Spurensuche im Indianerland. Hirzel. Stuttgart 2001, chapter 7.
 Voegelin, Carl F.; & Voegelin, Florence M. (1965). Classification of American Indian languages. Languages of the world, Native American fasc. 2, sec. 1.6). Anthropological Linguistics, 7 (7): 121–150.
 Zepeda, Ofelia; Hill, Jane H. (1991). The condition of Native American Languages in the United States. In R. H. Robins & E. M. Uhlenbeck (Eds.), Endangered languages (pp. 135–155). Oxford: Berg.

South America

 Adelaar, Willem F. H.; & Muysken, Pieter C. (2004). The languages of the Andes. Cambridge language surveys. Cambridge University Press.
 Fabre, Alain. (1998). "Manual de las lenguas indígenas sudamericanas, I-II". München: Lincom Europa.
 Kaufman, Terrence. (1990). Language history in South America: What we know and how to know more. In D. L. Payne (Ed.), Amazonian linguistics: Studies in lowland South American languages (pp. 13–67). Austin: University of Texas Press. .
 Kaufman, Terrence. (1994). The native languages of South America. In C. Mosley & R. E. Asher (Eds.), Atlas of the world's languages (pp. 46–76). London: Routledge.
 Key, Mary R. (1979). The grouping of South American languages. Tübingen: Gunter Narr Verlag.
 Loukotka, Čestmír. (1968). Classification of South American Indian languages. Los Angeles: Latin American Studies Center, University of California.
 Mason, J. Alden. (1950). The languages of South America. In J. Steward (Ed.), Handbook of South American Indians (Vol. 6, pp. 157–317). Smithsonian Institution Bureau of American Ethnology bulletin (No. 143). Washington, D.C.: Government Printing Office.
 Migliazza, Ernest C.; & Campbell, Lyle. (1988). Panorama general de las lenguas indígenas en América. Historia general de América (Vol. 10). Caracas: Instituto Panamericano de Geografía e Historia.
 Rodrigues, Aryon. (1986). Linguas brasileiras: Para o conhecimento das linguas indígenas. São Paulo: Edições Loyola.
 Rowe, John H. (1954). Linguistics classification problems in South America. In M. B. Emeneau (Ed.), Papers from the symposium on American Indian linguistics (pp. 10–26). University of California publications in linguistics (Vol. 10). Berkeley: University of California Press.
 Sapir, Edward. (1929). Central and North American languages. In The encyclopædia britannica: A new survey of universal knowledge (14 ed.) (Vol. 5, pp. 138–141). London: The Encyclopædia Britannica Company, Ltd.
 Voegelin, Carl F.; & Voegelin, Florence M. (1977). Classification and index of the world's languages. Amsterdam: Elsevier. .
 Debian North American Indigenous Languages Project

External links

 Catálogo de línguas indígenas sul-americanas
 Diccionario etnolingüístico y guía bibliográfica de los pueblos indígenas sudamericanos
 Towards a general typology of South American indigenous languages. A bibliographical database
 South American Languages
 Indigenous Peoples Languages: Articles, News, Videos
 Documentation Center of the Linguistic Minorities of Panama
 The Archive of the Indigenous Languages of Latin America
 Indigenous Language Institute
 The Society for the Study of the Indigenous Languages of the Americas (SSILA)
 Southern Oregon Digital Archives First Nations Tribal Collection (collection of ethnographic, linguistic, & historical material)
 Center for the Study of the Native Languages of the Plains and Southwest
 Project for the Documentation of the Languages of Mesoamerica 
 Programa de Formación en Educación Intercultural Bilingüe para los Países Andinos
 Native American Language Center (University of California at Davis)
 Native Languages of the Americas
 International Journal of American Linguistics 
 Our Languages (Saskatchewan Indian Cultural Centre)
 Swadesh Lists of Brazilian Native Languages
 Alaska Native Language Center

 
Languages